QuickTime Broadcaster is an audio and video RTP/RTSP server by Apple Inc. for Mac OS X. It is separate from Apple's QuickTime Streaming Server, as it is not a service daemon but a desktop application. It is able to stream live video and audio over a network in any QuickTime supported streaming codec.

The latest version delivers increased compatibility with Mac OS X Leopard and provides important bug fixes.

New features include:
 H.264 (MPEG-4 Part 10 video) live broadcasting
 3G streaming support for sending live broadcasts to multimedia enabled cell phones
 Dramatically improved performance for streaming 640x480 30fps video
 Increased standards support including 3GPP and ISMA (Internet Streaming Media Alliance)

External links
 

Broadcaster
MacOS-only software made by Apple Inc.
Streaming software
MacOS Server